Theatre of Death (also known as Blood Fiend) is a 1967 British horror movie directed by Samuel Gallu and starring Christopher Lee as a theatre director whose Grand Guignol theatre is thought to be linked to a series of murders.

Cast

Philippe Darvas – Christopher Lee
Dani Gireaux –	Lelia Goldoni
Charles Marquis – Julian Glover
Inspector George Micheaud – Ivor Dean
Karl Schiller – Joseph Furst
Andre, Patron of Cafe – Steve Plytas
Colette – Betty Woolfe
Joseph – Leslie Handford
Patron's Wife – Miki Iveria
Pierre – Fraser Kerr
Heidi – Dilys Watling
Voodoo Dancer – Lita Scott
Madame Angelique – Evelyn Laye
Nicole Chapelle – Jenny Till
Ferdi – Terence Soall
La Poule – Esther Anderson
Jean, Stage Manager – Peter Cleall
Girl on Scooter – Suzanne Owens
Belly Dancer –	Julie Mendez
Voodoo Dancer – Evrol Puckerin
Voodoo Drummers – The Tony Scott Drummers

References

External links
 

1967 films
1967 horror films
1960s mystery thriller films
British horror films
British mystery thriller films
Films scored by Elisabeth Lutyens
Films set in a theatre
Films set in Paris
Films shot at Associated British Studios
Films directed by Samuel Gallu
1960s English-language films
1960s British films